Surendra Institute of Engineering & Management is a Graduate Engineering and Management College established in the year 2009 in Siliguri, West Bengal, India, under the aegis of a charitable society Bidya Bharati Foundation. The institute was inaugurated by Mr. Asok Bhattacharya, the then Minister for MAUD, Govt. of West Bengal & Mr. Sourav Ganguly, former Captain, Indian Cricket Team.It is also approved by AICTE and affiliated to MAKAUT, formerly known as WBUT. It is named in the memory of (Late) Mr. Surendra Agarwal.

SIEM offers Bachelor of Technology Computer Science and Engineering, Electrical Engineering, Civil Engineering, Electronics and Communication Engineering, Mechanical Engineering.

Campus
SIEM is located in Dhukuria, Siliguri. The academics building is around 1,00,000 sq feet. The college campus consists of:  classrooms, laboratories, library and offices. The institutional building houses spacious lecture halls, seminar halls, laboratories and workshops, equipped with modern amenities.

Academics
SIEM(Surendra Institute of Engineering & Management) provides B.Tech Course in Electronics & Communications Engineering, Computer Science & Engineering, Mechanical Engineering, Electrical Engineering, and Civil Engineering. Situated in Siliguri (West Bengal), the college has recognition by All India Council for Technical Education (AICTE) and affiliated to Maulana Abul Kalam Azad University of Technology (MAKAUT), formerly known as West Bengal Technical University (WBUT).

Engineering Branches

 Civil Engineering
 Computer Science & Engineering
 Mechanical Engineering
 Electrical Engineering
 Electronics & Communication Engineering

Departments 
 Department of Physics 
 Department of Mathematics 
 Department of Chemistry 
 Department of Humanities

See also

References

External links
 http://siemsiliguri.org/
 http://wikimapia.org/16896850/siem

Engineering colleges in West Bengal
Universities and colleges in Darjeeling district
Education in Siliguri
Educational institutions established in 2009
2009 establishments in West Bengal